The 'Vijayawada City Police ,is the local law enforcement agency for the city of Vijayawada, Andhra Pradesh and is headed by the city police commissioner.

Organizational structure
The Vijayawada Police Commissionerate is headed by Commissioner of Police and Two Deputy commissioner of Police and Assistant Commissioner of Police with particular number of police stations.

Current structure
The Vijayawada City Police control the following zones:
East Zone
West Zone
Central Zone
South Zone
North Zone
Traffic Zone

Command Control Center
Vijayawada Police has a Command Control Center. With the help of this center, the city police can monitor the whole city.

See also
 Andhra Pradesh Police
 Visakhapatnam City Police

References

Government of Vijayawada
Metropolitan law enforcement agencies of India
Andhra Pradesh Police
1983 establishments in Andhra Pradesh
Government agencies established in 1983